The International Journal of Remote Sensing is a semimonthly peer-reviewed scientific journal covering research on remote sensing. It was established in 1980 and is published by Taylor & Francis on behalf of the Remote Sensing and Photogrammetry Society, of which it is the official journal. The journal Remote Sensing Reviews, which was established in 1983, was incorporated into the International Journal of Remote Sensing in 2001. The editors-in-chief are Timothy A. Warner (West Virginia University) and Arthur P. Cracknell (University of Dundee). According to the Journal Citation Reports, the journal has a 2020 impact factor of 3.151.

References

External links

Geography journals
Remote sensing journals
Publications established in 1980
Semi-monthly journals
English-language journals
Taylor & Francis academic journals
Academic journals associated with learned and professional societies of the United Kingdom